Nochnoy Dozor may refer to:

 Night Watch (Lukyanenko novel), 1998 opening of Sergei Lukyanenko's Watch fantasy tetralogy
 Night Watch (2004 film), Russian film based on Lukyanenko's novel
 Night Watch (video game), a 2005 video game based on the novel and the film
Nochnoy Dozor (group), activist group in Estonia
Nochnoy Dozor (band), a Doom Metal band from Athens, Greece
 "Nochnoi Dozor", track by Powerwolf from the album  Preachers of the Night

See also 
 Night Watch (disambiguation)